Irina Vadimovna Voronina (born December 19, 1977) is a Russian stand-up comedian, actress, and model. As a model, she was also the Playboy Playmate for January 2001.

Biography 
Voronina was born in Dzerzhinsk, Gorky Oblast, Russian SFSR, Soviet Union. She first started working as a model at age 14, appearing in a show in Sevastopol. She was chosen as Playboy's Playmate of the Month in January 2001, and appeared in numerous Playboy videos. She has also modeled for another adult magazine, Perfect 10. She appeared in the 2005 Playmates at Play at the Playboy Mansion swimsuit calendar as calendar girl of May. The calendar was the inaugural Playmates at Play calendar and it was shot on the grounds of Playboy Mansion in 2004. It was Playboy's first attempt at creating a non-nude swimsuit calendar featuring Playmates similar in style with those from Sports Illustrated Swimsuit Issue. 
 
She was the 2008 St. Pauli Girl Beer spokesmodel, a position held in previous years by other Playboy Playmates.

She has appeared in the films Reno 911!: Miami and Epic Movie. She was also a series regular on Adult Swim's first ever live action show Saul of the Mole Men (Cartoon Network), playing the role of Fallopia. Her feature film credits include 2007's Balls of Fury and 2012's Piranha 3DD as Kiki. In 2010, she appeared in an episode of iCarly entitled "iSell Penny Tees". Voronina had a supporting role in HDNet's TV series Svetlana. In 2018, she appeared in an episode of 13 Reasons Why.

As of 2015, Voronina has performed as a stand-up comedian throughout Los Angeles and surrounding areas. In 2018, Voronina was chosen to perform at the Comedy Festivals of San Diego, Joshua Tree, Palm Springs, Burbank and Orange County, as well as Los Angeles' LaughRiot Grrrl. In August, 2019, her television stand-up debut aired on the second season of Amazon Prime Video's Laugh After Dark.

References

External links

 
 
  Irina Voronina on Myspace

1977 births
Living people
Russian female models
American female models
Russian emigrants to the United States
People from Dzerzhinsk, Russia
2000s Playboy Playmates
Russian actresses
American actresses
Glamour models
Russian women comedians
21st-century American women